Giulio Mastrogiudice (died 1537) was a Roman Catholic prelate who served as Bishop of Vulturara e Montecorvino (1526–1537).

Biography
On 21 Nov 1526, Giulio Mastrogiudice was appointed during the papacy of Pope Clement VII as Bishop of Vulturara e Montecorvino. He served as Bishop of Vulturara e Montecorvino until his death in 1537.

References

External links and additional sources 
 (for Chronology of Bishops) 
 (for Chronology of Bishops) 

16th-century Italian Roman Catholic bishops
1537 deaths
Bishops appointed by Pope Clement VII